Eric Alexander (born April 14, 1988) is an American former professional soccer player.

Career

College and amateur
Alexander attended Portage Central High School, where he was named NSCAA/adidas Boys High School National Player of the Year and Gatorade National Boys Soccer Player of the Year in 2005, before playing college soccer for the Indiana University Hoosiers from 2006 to 2009. He was named to the Big Ten All-Freshman team in his first year, started all 22 matches and was named to the All-Big Ten first-team and the NSCAA/adidas Great Lakes All-Region second-team as a sophomore and a junior.

During his college years Alexander also played for Kalamazoo Kingdom, West Michigan Edge and Kalamazoo Outrage in the USL Premier Development League.

Professional

Alexander was drafted in the third round (44th overall) of the 2010 MLS SuperDraft by FC Dallas. He made his professional debut on March 27, 2010, in Dallas's opening game of the 2010 MLS season against Houston Dynamo. After initially receiving limited time in his first season, Alexander started eleven consecutive matches to close the 2010 season and was a key player during FC Dallas' nineteen-game unbeaten streak. In all he would appear in 17 league matches scoring two goals and assisting on three.

Alexander was traded to Portland Timbers on August 19, 2011, after making 22 league appearances during the 2011 campaign for FC Dallas in exchange for Jeremy Hall. In his first full season in Portland, Alexander appeared in 24 league matches and recorded a team leading 6 assists.

On February 11, 2013, Alexander was traded to New York Red Bulls in exchange for allocation money. Alexander was an important player for New York in his first year at the club as he appeared in all 34 league matches and scored 4 goals, helping the club to its first major title the 2013 MLS Supporters' Shield. During the 2014 season Alexander once again appeared in all 34 league matches scoring 2 goals and assisting on 9 others.

On January 27, 2015, Alexander was traded to Montreal Impact alongside Ambroise Oyongo, an international player roster spot and allocation money for Felipe and the 1st pick in the MLS allocation ranking. After a season and a half with Montreal, Alexander was traded to the Houston Dynamo in exchange for general and targeted allocation money.

In his first year with the Dynamo, Alexander made only 10 appearances, 3 of them starts. In 2017 he helped the Dynamo make the playoffs for the first time in 3 seasons, however Alexander suffered a MCL sprain on May 6 that caused him to miss 4 months. He was able to return to action on September 23 against New York City FC. Alexander appeared in all 5 of the Dynamo playoff games that season and got an assist on Mauro Manotas's goal that put the Dynamo up 2–1 against his former club the Portland Timbers in the Western Conference Semi Finals.

Alexander was selected by FC Cincinnati in the 2018 MLS Expansion Draft.

On August 9, 2019, Alexander returned to FC Dallas following his release from Cincinnati two days previously. His FC Dallas contract expired at the end of 2019. Retired to finish college at Indiana University.

International
On December 21, 2010, Alexander was called up to the United States national team for a friendly game against Chile.  He made his debut on January 22, 2011.

On January 3, 2014, he was again called up, this time as part of a 26-man roster that trained in Carson, California and São Paulo, Brazil as coach Jürgen Klinsmann prepared the side for the 2014 FIFA World Cup.

Honors

FC Dallas
 Major League Soccer Western Conference Championship (1): 2010

New York Red Bulls
 MLS Supporters' Shield(1): 2013

Houston Dynamo

 US Open Cup(1): 2018

Career Statistics

Club

References

External links
 
 

1988 births
Living people
People from Portage, Michigan
American expatriate soccer players
United States men's international soccer players
Association football midfielders
Indiana Hoosiers men's soccer players
Kalamazoo Kingdom players
West Michigan Edge players
Kalamazoo Outrage players
FC Dallas players
Portland Timbers players
New York Red Bulls players
CF Montréal players
FC Montreal players
Houston Dynamo FC players
Rio Grande Valley FC Toros players
FC Cincinnati players
Soccer players from Michigan
Expatriate soccer players in Canada
FC Dallas draft picks
USL League Two players
Major League Soccer players
USL Championship players
American soccer players